Vučja Vas (in older sources Vučja ves) is a village in the Municipality of Križevci in northeastern Slovenia. It lies on the regional road from Ljutomer to Radenci. The area is part of the traditional region of Styria. The municipality is now included in the Mura Statistical Region.

A small Neo-Gothic chapel in the settlement was totally rebuilt in 1986 on the site and in the style of an older chapel dating to 1876.

Notable people
Notable people that were born or lived in Vučja Vas include:
 Ciril Cvetko (1920–1999), composer and conductor
 Dragotin Cvetko (1911–1993), musicologist

References

External links
Vučja Vas on Geopedia

Populated places in the Municipality of Križevci